Nova Ltd. (formerly Nova Measuring Instruments) is a publicly traded company, headquartered in Israel, a provider of metrology devices for advanced process control used in semiconductor manufacturing. Shares of the company are traded on the NASDAQ Global Market and on the Tel Aviv Stock Exchange.

History 
Nova Ltd. was founded in May 1993 by Giora Dishon and Moshe Finarov. Dishon graduated from the Hebrew University of Jerusalem with a Ph.D in materials science. Finarov earned a Ph.D in semiconductor physics from the Technical University in Moscow.

Intel Corporation became a client of and investor in Nova in 1997. In 1999 Nova announced the establishment of a subsidiary in Japan, Nova Measuring Instruments K.K., and that it was opening offices in Singapore in order to expand its presence in the Asia-Pacific market. Nova executed its initial public offering on the NASDAQ exchange in April 2000. In 2006 Nova acquired HyperNex Inc., a Pennsylvania-based developer of microstructure analysis tools.

See also 
 Metrology
 Semiconductor device fabrication
 TA BlueTech Index
 List of Israeli companies quoted on the Nasdaq

References 

Equipment semiconductor companies
Companies listed on the Nasdaq
Companies listed on the Tel Aviv Stock Exchange
Semiconductor companies of Israel
Companies established in 1993
Israeli brands